Clair L. Nelson (April 22, 1940 – January 13, 2019) was an American politician, businessman, and educator

Nelson was born in Elk Lakke Township, Grant County, Minnesota and graduated from Barrett High School in Barrett, Minnesota. He lived in Barrett, Minnesota with his wife and family. Nelson served in the Minnesota National Guard and graduated from Minnesota State University, Moorhead with a bachelor's degree in physical education and mathematics. Nelson served in the Minnesota House of Representatives from 1987 to 1990 and was a Democrat. He was a farmer, builder, and a school teacher. Nelson died at Sanford Health in Bismarck, North Dakota.

References

1940 births
2019 deaths
People from Grant County, Minnesota
Minnesota State University Moorhead alumni
Minnesota National Guard personnel
Businesspeople from Minnesota
Farmers from Minnesota
Schoolteachers from Minnesota
Democratic Party members of the Minnesota House of Representatives